Chopardiella latipennis, common name Amazon mantis, is a species of praying mantis in the family Mantidae.  They are native to South America.

References

Mantidae
Insects of South America
Insects described in 1985